A musketeer is an early-modern type of infantry soldier.

Musketeer or Musketeers may also refer to:

Arts 
 The Musketeers, a 1961 Danish film 
 The Musketeer, a 2001 American film
 The Musketeers, a 2014 BBC television series

Other uses 
 Musketeers (synchronized skating team)
 Beechcraft Musketeer, a trainer aircraft
 Operation Musketeer (disambiguation)
 Xavier Musketeers, the sports teams of Xavier University in the United States
 Fans of Elon Musk, usually in a pejorative sense

See also
 The Three Musketeers (disambiguation)
 Mouseketeer
 Musket

References